Asarkina is a genus of hoverfly.

Species
A. assimilis (Macquart, 1846)
A. ayyari Ghorpadé, 1994
A. belli Ghorpadé, 1994
A. bhima Ghorpadé, 1994
A. bigoti Van der Goot, 1964
A. biroi Bezzi, 1908
A. cingulata (Bigot, 1884)
A. consequens (Walker, 1857)
A. eurytaeniata Bezzi, 1908
A. hema Ghorpadé, 1994
A. incisuralis (Macquart, 1855)
A. longirostris (Meijere, 1908)
A. morokanaensis (Meijere, 1908)
A. papuana Bezzi, 1908
A. pitambara Ghorpadé, 1994
A. porcina (Coquillett, 1898)
A. ribbei Bezzi, 1908
A. rostrata (Wiedemann, 1824)
A. salviae (Fabricius, 1787)

References

External links

 http://www.papua-insects.nl/insect%20orders/Diptera/Syrphoidea/Syrphoidea.htm

Syrphini
Diptera of Australasia
Diptera of Asia
Hoverfly genera
Taxa named by Pierre-Justin-Marie Macquart